The GWR 3501 Class were ten broad gauge  locomotives built by the Great Western Railway.

They were built in 1885 as  locomotives, but five were rebuilt in 1890 as  tender locomotives for working express trains between Exeter and Plymouth.  They comprised the first ten locomotives of Lot 64, the remainder of which comprised ten similar locomotive Nos. 3511 to 3520 built to the standard gauge. In 1892 the broad gauge was abandoned and the locomotives were all converted to standard gauge tender locomotives, becoming a part of the 3201 Class.

2-4-0T locomotives

 3501 (1885 - 1890)
 3502 (1885 - 1890)
 3503 (1885 - 1892)
 3504 (1885 - 1892)
 3505 (1885 - 1890)
 3506 (1885 - 1892)
 3507 (1885 - 1891)
 3508 (1885 - 1890)
 3509 (1885 - 1892)
 3510 (1885 - 1892)

2-4-0 locomotives
 3501 (1890 - 1892)
 3502 (1890 - 1892)
 3505 (1890 - 1892)
 3507 (1891 - 1892)
 3508 (1890 - 1892)

References
 
 
 
 

3501
Broad gauge (7 feet) railway locomotives
2-4-0T locomotives
2-4-0 locomotives
Railway locomotives introduced in 1885
Passenger locomotives